Dobryanka is a town in Perm Krai, Russia, located on the bank of the Kama Reservoir,  north of Perm, the administrative center of the krai. Population:

History
Considered to be one of the oldest inhabited localities in Perm Krai, Dobryanka was first mentioned in 1623. In 1752, an ironworks was built at the mouth of the Dobryanka River, and a settlement developed around it. In 1943, the settlement was granted town status. The town served as the administrative center of Dobryansky District, which was abolished in 1993.

Administrative and municipal status
Within the framework of administrative divisions, it is, together with the work settlement of Polazna and 110 rural localities, incorporated as the town of krai significance of Dobryanka—an administrative unit with the status equal to that of the districts. As a municipal division, the town of Dobryanka, together with 8 rural localities, is incorporated as Dobryanskoye Urban Settlement within Dobryansky Municipal District and serves as the municipal district's administrative center. The work settlement of Polazna and the remaining 102 rural localities are grouped into one urban settlement and six rural settlements within Dobryansky Municipal District.

Economy

References

Notes

Sources

External links

Official website of Dobryanka 
Dobryanka Business Directory 

Cities and towns in Perm Krai
Permsky Uyezd
Populated places established in the 1620s
Populated places on the Kama River